Tom Clark (March 1, 1941 – August 18, 2018, aged 77) was an American poet, editor and biographer.

Education and personal life
Clark was born on the Near West Side of Chicago, and attended Fenwick High School in Oak Park.  After high school, he attended the University of Michigan, where he received a Hopwood Award for poetry. He then won a Fulbright Scholarship to undertake graduate study at Gonville and Caius College, Cambridge in England (1963-5), before spending further time pursuing doctoral research (on the advice of Donald Davie) at the newly-established University of Essex. It was while in Britain that Clark famously hitchhiked through Somerset in the company of Allen Ginsberg.

On March 22, 1968, he married Angelica Heinegg, at St. Mark's Church in-the-Bowery, New York City. As of 2013, he was living in California.

Career
Clark was poetry editor of The Paris Review from 1963 to 1973, and published numerous volumes of poetry with Black Sparrow Press, including a verse biography: Junkets on a Sad Planet: Scenes from the Life of John Keats (1994). His literary essays and reviews appeared in The New York Times, The Times Literary Supplement, Los Angeles Times, San Francisco Chronicle, London Review of Books, and many other journals. Some of his essays on contemporary poetry were collected in The Poetry Beat: Reviewing the Eighties. From 1987 to 2008, he taught poetics at New College of California.

Residing in California for the remainder of his life, Clark was an active writer, producing poetry, fiction, and nonfiction. In 1991, he published a biography of Charles Olson, one of his poetic mentors, titled Charles Olson: The Allegory of a Poet’s Life (Norton: 1991).

Death
On the evening of Friday, August 17, 2018, Clark was walking across a street in Berkeley, California, and was hit by a car at about 8:40 p.m. He died on the following day.

Bibliography

Poetry collections

Literary biography

Fiction

Essays on Poetry

Other books by Clark

References

External links
Finding aid to the Tom Clark papers at Columbia University Rare Book & Manuscript Library 

The World Begins: A visit with Tom Clark
Tom Clark Author Page at Jacket Magazine
Tom Clark page at the Poetry Foundation
Tom Clark's Blog
Tom Clark page and poem at the Academy of American Poets
Tom Clark, 1941-. American author Washington University Libraries bio
"Knights of the Road" - Tom Clark reviews "This is the Beat Generation: New York, San Francisco, Paris" by James Campbell in the London Review of Books (Vol. 22 No. 13 · 6 Jul 2000)

1941 births
2018 deaths
American magazine editors
American male poets
Baseball writers
American male biographers
New College of California faculty
Poets from Illinois
Road incident deaths in California
The Paris Review
20th-century American poets
20th-century American biographers
20th-century American male writers
21st-century American poets
21st-century American male writers
University of Michigan alumni
Alumni of Gonville and Caius College, Cambridge
Writers from Chicago
21st-century American non-fiction writers
Sportswriters from Illinois
Historians from Illinois